Maceda is a municipality located in the province of Ourense in the Galicia region of north-west Spain.

References

See also
A Agualada, Coristanco
Costoya

Municipalities in the Province of Ourense